Ligusticum huteri is a species of flowering plant in the family Apiaceae, endemic to the Serra de Tramuntana on Majorca, Spain.

References

huteri
Endemic flora of Spain
Environment of Mallorca
Matorral shrubland
Critically endangered plants
Critically endangered biota of Europe
Plants described in 1887
Taxonomy articles created by Polbot